Eucharitinae is a subfamily of chalcid wasps in the family Eucharitidae.

Genera
These 31 genera belong to the subfamily Eucharitinae:

 Ancylotropus Cameron, 1909 c g
 Athairocharis Heraty, 2002 c g
 Austeucharis Boucek, 1988 c g
 Babcockiella Heraty, 2002 c g
 Chalcura Kirby, 1886 c g
 Cherianella Narendran, 1994 c g
 Cyneucharis Heraty, 2002 c g
 Eucharis Latreille, 1804 c g
 Eucharissa Westwood, 1868 c g
 Hydrorhoa Kieffer, 1905 c g
 Kapala Cameron, 1884 c g b
 Latina (wasp) Koçak & Kemal, 2008 g i
 Mateucharis Boucek & Watsham, 1982 c g
 Mictocharis Heraty, 2002 c g
 Neolosbanus Heraty, 1994 c g
 Neostilbula Heraty, 2002 c g
 Obeza Heraty, 1985 c g b
 Parapsilogastrus Ghesquière, 1946 c g
 Pseudochalcura Ashmead, 1904 c g b
 Pseudometagea Ashmead, 1899 c g b
 Psilocharis Heraty, 1994 c g
 Rhipipalloidea Girault, 1934 c g
 Saccharissa Kirby, 1886 c g
 Stilbula Spinola, 1811 c g
 Stilbuloida Boucek, 1988 c g
 Striostilbula Boucek, 1988 c g
 Substilbula Boucek, 1988 c g
 Thoracantha Latreille, 1825 c g
 Thoracanthoides Girault, 1928 c g
 Tricoryna Kirby, 1886 c g
 Zulucharis Heraty, 2002 c g

Data sources: i = ITIS, c = Catalogue of Life, g = GBIF, b = Bugguide.net

References

Further reading

External links

 

Parasitic wasps
Chalcidoidea